Opacus is a cloud variety commonly found in stratocumulus, altocumulus, altostratus, and stratus cloud types, this cloud variety has an opaque appearance, which hides the location of the Sun and Moon, it is the opposite of translucidus, which is translucent and gives away the location of the Sun and Moon

See also 
Translucidus (cloud variety)
Perlucidus (cloud variety)

References 

Cloud types